The Bellenden Ker Range, also known as the Wooroonooran Range is a coastal mountain range in Far North Queensland, Australia. Part of the Great Dividing Range it is located between Gordonvale and Babinda.

The whole of the range falls within the Wet Tropics World Heritage Area and is covered in richly diverse world heritage listed wet tropical forests, including species of flora and fauna endemic to the range.  The range also forms part of the Wooroonooran Important Bird Area, identified as such by BirdLife International because it supports populations of a range of bird species endemic to Queensland's Wet Tropics.  Most of the range is also a gazetted protected area named Wooroonooran National Park.

Queensland's two highest mountains, Mount Bartle Frere (1622 m) and Mount Bellenden Ker (1593 m) form part of this range, and Walshs Pyramid (922 m) (one of the highest free-standing natural pyramids in the world) is located at the range's northern end .

History
Lieutenant Phillip King named the range  after the English botanist John Bellenden Ker Gawler, following the suggestion made to him by his ships own botanist, Allan Cunningham. Archibald Meston was an early explorer of the range.

Rivers
The Mulgrave River rises on the southwestern slopes of the range and then flows north around the northern end and then turns south flowing parallel to the eastern side. Russell River drains the southeast parts of the range. A number of waterfalls cascade off the range including Kearneys Falls, Fishery Falls, Josephine Falls, Tchupala Falls, Wallicher Falls, Nandroya Falls, Silver Creek Falls, Whites Falls, and Clamshell Falls.

See also

 List of mountains in Australia

References

Mountain ranges of Queensland
Important Bird Areas of Queensland
Landforms of Far North Queensland